Brevisomabathynella cunyuensis is a species of crustacean. It was first found in Western Australia. It stands out within its family by its pygmoid body and its long head. At the same time, its mouthparts show: a very large labrum with a great number (over 30) of teeth; its incisor process with four main teeth and three very small other teeth, arranged in two groups; and the distal-inner spines of the farthermost endite of its maxillule being longer than its terminal spines. These distinct characters appear to have developed due to its predatory habits, which in turn are evidenced by the presence of an ostracod prey in its gut. This genus closely resembles the genus Notobathynella.

See also
Brevisomabathynella cooperi

References

Further reading
Abrams, Kym M., et al. "Molecular phylogenetic, morphological and biogeographic evidence for a new genus of parabathynellid crustaceans (Syncarida: Bathynellacea) from groundwater in an ancient southern Australian landscape." Invertebrate systematics 27.2 (2013): 146-172.
Watts, C. H. S., and W. F. Humphreys. "Fourteen new Dytiscidae (Coleoptera) of the genera Limbodessus Guignot, Paroster Sharp, and Exocelina Broun from underground waters in Australia." Transactions of the Royal Society of South Australia 133.1 (2009): 62-107.

External links

Syncarida
Crustaceans described in 2006